Óscar Julio Ferro Gándara (born 2 March 1967) is a retired Uruguayan footballer who played as a goalkeeper.

Club career
Born in Montevideo, Ferro started and finished his career with local and national giants C.A. Peñarol, winning five of his sixth national championships with the team in his first spell, which lasted 11 years. In 1995 he moved to Argentina and Ferro Carril Oeste, playing three seasons in the Primera División.

In the following years, in quick succession, Ferro represented Peru's Sporting Cristal, SD Compostela from Spain, Atlético Tucumán (Argentine second division), Defensor Sporting Club and Paraguayan side Club Guaraní. In 2002 the 35-year-old returned to his first club Peñarol, being part of the squad that won that year's league and retiring at the end of the next campaign.

Subsequently, Ferro continued to work with Peñarol as a goalkeeping coach.

International career
Ferro gained nine caps for Uruguay in seven years. He was selected for the teams that competed at the 1993 and 1995 Copa América tournaments– the latter ended in conquest for the Charrúas – but played backup on both occasions, to Robert Siboldi and Fernando Álvez respectively.

Honours

Club
Peñarol
Uruguayan Primera División: 1985, 1986, 1993, 1994, 1995, 2003
Copa Libertadores: 1987

Country
Copa América: 1995

References

External links
 Argentine League statistics at Fútbol XXI  
 National team data 
 
 

1967 births
Living people
Footballers from Montevideo
Uruguayan footballers
Association football goalkeepers
Uruguayan Primera División players
Peñarol players
Defensor Sporting players
Argentine Primera División players
Ferro Carril Oeste footballers
Atlético Tucumán footballers
Peruvian Primera División players
Sporting Cristal footballers
Segunda División players
SD Compostela footballers
Club Guaraní players
Uruguay international footballers
1993 Copa América players
1995 Copa América players
Copa América-winning players
Uruguayan expatriate footballers
Expatriate footballers in Argentina
Expatriate footballers in Peru
Expatriate footballers in Spain
Expatriate footballers in Paraguay
Uruguayan expatriate sportspeople in Argentina
Uruguayan expatriate sportspeople in Peru